= 4/9 =

4/9 may refer to:

- April 9 (month-day date notation)
- September 4 (day-month date notation)
- The fraction equal to approximately 0.44444
